Marie-Sœurette Mathieu (born August 10, 1949 in Port-au-Prince) is a Haitian sociologist, teacher and writer who lives currently in Quebec. She is also a painter.

She left her native land in 1970 and went first to the United States and later to Quebec. She studied sociology and education at the UQAM, and she is a member of UNEQ and the Société littéraire de Laval, French organisation in Laval, Québec.

Bibliography
Lueurs  poems Port-au-prince 1971
Poèmes d'autrefois  et Fêlures Montréal : Schindler Press 1976
Lueurs ; et, Quinze poèmes d'éveil,  Montréal : Édition Lagomatik 1991
Pagaille dans la ville, Montréal : Humanitas 1995
Ardémée  poèmes Montréal : Humanitas 1997
L'amour en exil, Montréal : Éditions du CIDIHCA 2000
Double choc pour Mélanie  Montréal : Éditions du CIDIHCA 2002 
Retrouvailles  Laval : Éditions Teichtner 2004
Un pas vers la Matrice, Montreal: Éditions Grenier 2009
L'autre face des Étoiles, Poèmes et Haïkus, Lorraine: Éditions Le grand fleuve 2012 Châteaux de sucre, roman, Lorraine: Éditions Le grand fleuve 2015 Version numériqueLa force des lettres, autobiographie, Montréal Édition du CIDIHCA 2018, (ISBN 978-2-89454-510-2) - L'Envol'', anthologie, Montreal Édition du CIDIHCA 2020, (ISBN 9782894 544273)

Notes 

Canadian women novelists
Canadian women poets
Canadian poets in French
Haitian emigrants to Canada
Haitian women novelists
20th-century Haitian novelists
21st-century Haitian novelists
20th-century Haitian poets
21st-century Haitian poets
Haitian women poets
People from Port-au-Prince
1949 births
Living people
Black Canadian writers
20th-century Canadian novelists
21st-century Canadian novelists
20th-century Canadian poets
21st-century Canadian poets
20th-century Canadian women writers
21st-century Canadian women writers
Canadian novelists in French
Black Canadian women